Barry Steven Blankley (born 27 October 1964) is an English former professional footballer who played in the Football League for Aldershot.

References

1964 births
Living people
English footballers
Association football defenders
English Football League players
People from Farnborough, Hampshire
Southampton F.C. players
Aldershot F.C. players
Woking F.C. players
Bashley F.C. players
Farnborough F.C. players
Basingstoke Town F.C. players